Brainscape is a web and mobile education platform that allows students to study adaptive flashcards. The website and mobile application allow students, teachers, and corporate trainers to create (or upload) electronic flashcards, and to find flashcards created by other users and publishers around the world. Brainscape flashcards and marketing content are also created by workers who receive US$5 per hour minus a 20 percent commission. Flashcards are all stored in the cloud and can be shared with groups of other learners.

Brainscape uses spaced repetition, which has been shown to increase rate of learning. Users rates their confidence in each flashcard, on a scale of 1-5, which subsequently determines how frequently to repeat the flashcard.  Lower-confidence items are repeated more frequently until the user upgrades their confidence rating, thereby creating an optimized study stream.  Brainscape has published a white paper which cites academic studies proving the viability of the cognitive science research that it applies in its technology. This includes how its features use active recall and metacognition.

History
The idea for Brainscape arose when its founder, Andrew Cohen, was attempting to study Spanish and French while living in Panama and Martinique from 2005 to 2007.  When Rosetta Stone and other educational resources were not working efficiently enough for him, Cohen created a Microsoft Excel program that would quiz him on individual vocabulary words and verb conjugations, then repeat those concepts within an interval of time that felt appropriate to his pace of learning.

Cohen later followed this passion by pursuing a master's degree in Education Technology from Columbia University, where he focused his graduate research on the concept of CBR and built a more complete prototype using the Java programming language.  In 2010, he partnered with Andy Lutz, the ex-VP of Product from The Princeton Review, and he began seeking venture capital and was able to raise over $3 million, in three tranches, by 2015. Brainscape has since expanded to several million registered users among students of all ages, especially in graduate and medical programs. However, the company recruits talent in the range of $5 to $12 per hour.

Services
Brainscape provides services including electronic flashcards, various study modes, collaborative editing tools, and teacher dashboards, via its website and iPhone, iPad and Android applications.

See also
 Spaced repetition software

References

American educational websites
American companies established in 2010
Companies based in New York City
2010 establishments in New York City